The   Yoon Youngha-class patrol vessel (Hangul: 윤영하급 미사일고속함) also known as PKG-class patrol vessel is a class of patrol ship of the Republic of Korea Navy. One variant is in active service and a smaller variant is planned. The first being the PKX-A or Yun Youngha-class missile patrol ship (Hangul: 윤영하급 고속함), and the second the  patrol boat (also known as Chamsuri-211-class patrol boat or Gumdoksuri-class patrol vessel).

Development 
The Republic of Korea Navy (ROKN) began development of the PKG class in 2003 after a Chamsuri-class (PKM-class) patrol boat was sunk during a naval clash with North Korean patrol boats on June 29, 2002. The codenamed PKX (Patrol Killer eXperimental) program is the patrol boat modernization project of the ROKN.

The PKX consist of two main designs. The larger, missile armed PKX-A(PKG) of approximately 500 tons and the smaller gun armed PKX-B(PKMR) of approximately 200 tons. PKX-A(PKG) is planned to take up some of the operations done by s, and the PKX-B(PKMR) is planned to replace the aging  fleet.

The first PKX-A(PKG) vessels were ordered from Hanjin Heavy Industries. The lead ship of the class, Yoon Youngha (PKG 711), named after Lieutenant Commander Yoon Youngha who was killed during the second battle of Yeonpyeong, was launched on June 28, 2007 and commissioned on December 17, 2008. The production of the PKX-A(PKG) are being divided between Hanjin Heavy Industries and STX in lots of four.

The PKX-B variant includes a 130 mm guided rocket launcher at the stern. The first vessel was launched in July 2016 and was commissioned in late 2017; all four ships in the first batch will be delivered by the end of 2019. A contract was awarded to Hanjin Heavy Industries for ships 5 through 8 in June 2017, which are scheduled to be delivered after 2020. The contract for ships 9 through 12 were awarded in early 2018. The PKX-B was specifically designed to counter North Korean fast swarming crafts. The 12-canister 130 mm guided rocket launcher can hit targets between  using a rocket weighing  with an  warhead. Rockets have GPS/INS midcourse guidance with data uplink and terminal IIR homing, and three can be fired simultaneously.

Ships in the class

 The PKX-A first six ships were named after the sailors of patrol boat PKM 357, who were killed during the Second Battle of Yeonpyeong in 2002.
 South Korean navies do not use the number '0', '4' when assigning Pennant numbers to their ships. In Korea, there is a superstitious belief that '4' is an unlucky number (much like Friday the 13th). '0' is also considered as bad luck. There are two exceptions, though - MLS 560 Wonsan and submarines.

See also 
 Republic of Korea Navy

References

Patrol vessels of the Republic of Korea Navy
Patrol boat classes
Ships built in South Korea